Homer Hefner Peel (October 10, 1902 – April 8, 1997) was an American professional baseball player and manager during the first half of the 20th century. His career lasted for a quarter century (1923–42; 1946–50), including 21 years as an outfielder and four years as a non-playing manager. Peel appeared in 186 Major League Baseball games over five seasons (1927; 1929–30; 1933–34) for the St. Louis Cardinals, Philadelphia Phillies and New York Giants. He served in the United States Navy during World War II.

Peel batted only .238 with an even 100 hits, two home runs and 44 RBI during his Major League career. But he was a member of the 1933 World Series champion Giants, appearing in two games of the 1933 World Series. He was a defensive replacement in center field for Kiddo Davis in Game 2, and singled as a pinch hitter for Freddie Fitzsimmons in Game 3 off Earl Whitehill of the Washington Senators.

In addition, Peel was one of the top players in minor league baseball during the 1920s and 1930s He hit over .300 for more than a dozen seasons and was known as "the Ty Cobb of the Texas League", where hit batted .325 lifetime. He also managed the Fort Worth Cats, Oklahoma City Indians and Shreveport Sports in the Texas circuit.

Peel died in Shreveport, Louisiana, at age 94.

References

External links
, or Retrosheet

1902 births
1997 deaths
United States Navy personnel of World War II
Baseball players from Texas
Fort Worth Cats players
Houston Buffaloes players
Major League Baseball outfielders
Marshall Indians players
Minneapolis Millers (baseball) players
Minor league baseball managers
Nashville Vols players
New York Giants (NL) players
Oakland Oaks (baseball) players
Oklahoma City Indians players
Paris Red Peppers players
People from Milam County, Texas
Philadelphia Phillies players
Rochester Red Wings players
San Diego Padres (minor league) players
Shreveport Sports players
St. Louis Cardinals players
Syracuse Stars (AA) players
Texarkana Twins players
Toledo Mud Hens players
Winston-Salem Twins players
Temple Eagles players